Tata Power Solar Systems Limited, formerly Tata BP Solar, is an Indian company that specialises in solar energy services. The company manufactures solar modules, solar cells, and other solar products, and provides EPC services for solar power projects.

In February 2017, Tata Power Solar became the first Indian company to ship over 1 GW solar modules worldwide. The company's manufacturing unit in Bangalore has a production capacity of 400 MW of modules and 300 MW of cells.

History
Tata Power and BP Solar established Tata BP Solar, a joint venture company, in 1989. The company began commercial operations in 1991 by establishing its first manufacturing unit with a production capacity of 3 MW.

BP Solar was closed on 21 December 2011, when BP announced its departure from the solar energy business. On 30 August 2012, Tata BP Solar India Limited was renamed as Tata Power Solar Systems Limited and became a wholly owned subsidiary of the Tata Group.

In August 2016, Tata Power Solar commissioned a 100 MW solar project at the NP Kunta Ultra Mega Solar Power Project in Anantapur, Andhra Pradesh. This was the largest solar project commissioned using domestically manufactured solar cells and modules at the time.

In 2022, Tata Power Solar raised 4,000 crore from Tata Power and a consortium of investors led by BlackRock, which also includes the Mubadala Investment Company.

Rooftop 
Tata Power Solar is one of the largest solar rooftop EPC players in India with a market share of 5.6%. The company completed the world's largest solar rooftop installation in August 2017. The rooftop project built on the cricket stadium in Mumbai, India will generate more than 1 million units and will reduce the power consumption by almost 25%.

Tata Power Solar has commissioned an 820.8 kWp solar rooftop at the Cricket Club of India (CCI), in Mumbai. It claims it is the world’s largest solar rooftop on a cricket stadium

820.8kWp Solar Rooftop System

CCI stadium in Mumbai Goes Green

Estimated generation 1.12 million units per annum

Offset 840 tonnes of carbon annually

The project was executed by Tata Power Solar to provide solar rooftop solution for the stadium located at Mumbai and was completed in 100 days. Shri Devendra Fadnavis, Honourable Chief Minister of Maharashtra did the inauguration of the stadium.

See also
Solar power in India
Solar Energy Corporation of India
Azure Power
Bridge to India

References

Solar energy companies of India
Photovoltaics manufacturers
Former BP subsidiaries
Manufacturing companies based in Noida
Indian companies established in 1989
Tata Power
1989 establishments in Uttar Pradesh
Manufacturing companies established in 1989
Energy companies established in 1989